Barbara Cooney (August 6, 1917 – March 10, 2000) was an American writer and illustrator of 110 children's books, published over sixty years. She received two Caldecott Medals for her work on Chanticleer and the Fox (1958) and Ox-Cart Man (1979), and a National Book Award for Miss Rumphius (1982). Her books have been translated into 10 languages.

For her contribution as a children's illustrator, Cooney was the U.S. nominee in 1994 for the biennial, international Hans Christian Andersen Award, the highest international recognition for creators of children's books.

Life
Cooney was born on 6 August 1917 in Room 1127 of the Hotel Bossert in Brooklyn, New York, to Russell Schenck Cooney (a stockbroker) and his wife Mae Evelyn Bossert (a painter). She had a twin brother and two younger brothers. Her family moved to Connecticut, where she attended Buckley Country Day School and later Boarding School. She started drawing and painting early in life, and was encouraged by her mother but allowed to learn independently.

Cooney graduated from Smith College with a history degree, but continued working at art, taking classes on etching and lithography at the Art Students League of New York. She began to make connections in the publishing world. Her first professional illustration was for Ake and His World by the Swedish poet Bertil Malmberg, which was published in 1940, a year after she graduated.

During World War II, Cooney served in the Women’s Army Corps. Soon after her service, she met and married Guy Murchie in 1944. They had two children, Gretel and Barnaby. She later divorced. In July 1949 she married Charles Talbot Porter; they had two children together: Phoebe and Charlie Porter.

Cooney had continued her illustration work. In 1959, she won the Caldecott Medal for Chanticleer and the Fox, writing and illustrating her version of the fable, "Chanticleer and the Fox." This was developed by Chaucer in his "The Nun's Priest's Tale." Beginning in her 40s, Cooney frequently traveled, gaining inspiration for illustrations and her writing. At home, she lived in Damariscotta, Maine, in a house built for her by one of her sons.

Among her many books, Cooney illustrated Ox-Cart Man (1980), written by American poet Donald Hall, for which she received her second Caldecott Medal. In 1975, she illustrated When the Sky is Like Lace. Written by Elinor Lander Horwitz, the book was selected as a New York Times Outstanding Book of the Year. With her book Miss Rumphius (1983), which she wrote and illustrated, she won the National Book Award in category Picture Books. That year William Steig and his Doctor De Soto also shared the award.

In 1996, Maine Governor Angus King honored Cooney by proclaiming a day in her name as "Barbara Cooney Day". Her last book, Basket Moon (2000), was published six months before her death at home in Damariscotta on March 10, 2000.

Portions of her original artwork are being displayed at Bowdoin College in Maine.

Style
Throughout her career, Cooney used a variety of techniques, preferring pen and ink, acrylic paints, and pastels. Her illustrations are often described as folk art. She most often chose folk stories to illustrate. While many of her books were in black and white, her "heart and soul are in color".

Quotes
On her mother: 
"She gave me all the materials I could wish for and then left me alone, didn’t smother me with instruction. Not that I ever took instruction very easily. My favorite days were when I had a cold and could stay home from school and draw all day long.... She was an enthusiastic painter of oils and watercolors. She was also very generous. I could mess with her paints and brushes all I wanted. On one condition: that I kept my brushes clean. The only art lesson my mother gave me was how to wash my brushes. Otherwise, she left me alone."

On Smith College and her art: "I have felt way behind technically; and what I’ve learned I have had to teach myself. To this day, I don’t consider myself a very skillful artist."
On her travels and learning the spirit of place: 
“It was not until I was in my forties, in the fifth decade of my life, that the sense of place, the spirit of place, became of paramount importance to me. It was then that I began my travels, that I discovered, through photography, the quality of light, and that I gradually became able to paint the mood of place.”

On receiving the Caldecott Medal in 1959: 
"I believe that children in this country need a more robust literary diet than they are getting.... It does not hurt them to read about good and evil, love and hate, life and death. Nor do I think they should read only about things that they understand.... a man’s reach should exceed his grasp. So should a child’s. For myself, I will never talk down to—or draw down to—children."

On her favorite works: "Of all the books I have done, 'Miss Rumphius,' 'Island Boy,' and 'Hattie and the Wild Waves,' are the closest to my heart. These three are as near as I ever will come to an autobiography".

Books illustrated
 
 Ake and His World, by Bertil Malmberg [1924, Swedish], 1940
 Uncle Snowball, 1940
 The King of Wreck Island, 1941
 The Kellyhorns, 1942
 Captain Pottle's House, 1943
 Shooting Star Farm, 1946
 American Folk Songs for Children, by Ruth Crawford Seeger, 1948
 Just Plain Maggie, 1948
 The Best Christmas, 1949
 Kildee House, by Rutherford George Montgomery, 1949
 Best Christmas, 1949
 Animal Folk Songs for Children, Ruth Crawford Seeger, 1950
 The Man Who Didn't Wash His Dishes, 1950
 Read Me More Stories, 1951
 The Pony That Ran Away, 1951
 The Pony That Kept a Secret, 1952
 Too Many Pets, 1952
 Yours with Love, Kate, by Miriam Mason, 1952
 Christmas in the Barn, 1952
 Where Have You Been?, 1952
 American Folk Songs for Christmas, by Ruth Crawford Seeger, 1953
 Five Little Peppers (Margaret Sidney?), 1954
 The Little Fir Tree, by Margaret Wise Brown, 1954
 Little Women, by Louisa May Alcott [1868–69], 1955
 City Springtime, 1957
 Freckle Face, 1957
 Chanticleer and the Fox, from Chaucer, adapted by Cooney, 1958
 The American Speller, 1961
 The Little Juggler, 1961
 Le Hibou et La Poussiquette, poem by Edward Lear [1871], translation by Francis Steegmuller, 1961
 Favorite Fairy Tales Told in Spain, 1963
 Wynken, Blynken and Nod, poem by Eugene Field [1889], 1964
 Papillot, Clignot et Dodo, poem by Eugene Field [1889], translation by Francis Steegmuller and Norbert Guterman, 1964
 Mother Goose in French, translations by Hugh Latham, 1964
 The Courtship, Merry Marriage, and Feast of Cock Robin and Jenny Wren, 1965
 Snow White and Rose Red, based on Brothers Grimm [German], 1966
 How the Hibernators Came to Bethlehem, 1966
 A Little Prayer, 1967
 Christmas, 1967
 The Crows of Pearblossom, by Aldous Huxley, 1967
 A Garland of Games and Other Diversions, 1969
 The Owl and the Pussycat, poem by Edward Lear [1871], 1969
 Bambi, a Life in the Woods, by Felix Salten [1923, German], 1970
 Princess Tales, 1971
 Seven Little Rabbits, 1972
 "Squawk to the Moon, Little Goose", by Edna Mitchell Preston, 1974
 Herman the Great, 1974
 Favourite Fairy Tales Told in Spain, retold by Virginia Haviland, 1974
 When the Sky is Like Lace, written by Elinor Lander Horwitz, a New York Times Outstanding Book of the Year, 1975. Reissued 2015
 Burton and Dudley, by Marjorie W. Sharmat, 1975
 The Donkey Prince, 1977
 Midsummer magic: a garland of stories, charms, and recipes, compiled by Ellin Greene, 1977
 Ox-Cart Man, poem by Donald Hall, 1979
 I Am Cherry Alive, the Little Girl Sang, poem by Delmore Schwartz, 1979
 Emma, 1980
 Tortillitas Para Mama and Other Nursery Rhymes, selected and translated by Margot C. Griego, 1981
 Little Brother and Little Sister, based on Brothers Grimm [German], 1982
 Miss Rumphius, by Cooney, 1982
 Spirit Child: A Story of the Nativity, 1984
 The Story of Holly and Ivy, by Rumer Godden [1958], 1985
 Peter and the Wolf Pop-Up Book, 1986
 Louhi, Witch of North Farm: A Story From Finland's Epic Poem 'The Kalevala', 1986
 Island Boy, by Cooney, 1988
 The Year of the Perfect Christmas Tree, by Gloria Houston, 1988
 Hattie and the Wild Waves: A story of Brooklyn, 1990
 The Big Book for Peace, by John Bierhorst, 1990
 Roxaboxen, by Alice McLerran, 1991
 Letting Swift River Go, by Jane Yolen, 1991
 Emily, by Michael Bedard, 1992 – historical fiction based on Emily Dickinson
 The Remarkable Christmas of the Cobbler's Sons, 1994
 Only Opal: The Diary of a Young Girl, based on the diary of Opal Whiteley, 1994
 Eleanor, 1996 – childhood biography of Eleanor Roosevelt
 Basket Moon, by Mary Lyn Ray, 1999 – Cooney's last book

References

External links

Barbara Cooney Papers, Archives & Special Collections at the Thomas J. Dodd Center, University of Connecticut
 Barbara Cooney on Women Children's Book Illustrators
 Cooney Exhibits
 
Interview with Barbara Cooney, All About Kids! TV Series #113 (1992)
 

1917 births
2000 deaths
20th-century American women artists
American children's writers
American women illustrators
Women's Army Corps soldiers
Art Students League of New York alumni
Caldecott Medal winners
American children's book illustrators
National Book Award for Young People's Literature winners
Buckley Country Day School alumni
People from Damariscotta, Maine
Writers from New York City
Smith College alumni